Anthela trisecta is a moth of the family Anthelidae first described by Thomas Pennington Lucas in 1898. It is found in Australia.

The wingspan is about 56 mm. The forewings are ochreous, shaded with faint fuscous. The hindwings are ochreous, strongly with ferrous.

References

Moths described in 1898
Anthelidae